Svatba upírů  is a Czech comedy film directed by Jaroslav Soukup. It was released in 1993.

External links
 

1993 films
Czech comedy films
1993 comedy films
Films based on works by Sheridan Le Fanu